The National Electoral Commission (NEC) is the national election commission of Tanzania.

Responsibilities
Article 74(6) of the constitution states its responsibilities:
Register voters for the union presidential and parliamentary elections.
Supervise the conduct of the presidential and parliamentary elections
Review and demarcate the electoral boundaries
Perform any other function as per the law such as organize referendums.

See also
Elections in Tanzania

References

Tanzania
Elections in Tanzania
1993 establishments in Tanzania